The Battle of Haeju was a small naval battle during the main phase of the Korean War. 

Off Haeju Bay in the Yellow Sea, on September 10, 1950, days before the Battle of Inchon, a South Korean navy patrol boat, PC-703, encountered a North Korean navy minelayer sailing vessel. After a brief fight, the North Korean minelayer was sunk with a loss of all crew and no South Korean casualties were reported. 

After the minelayer's sinking, PC-703 discovered that the sunken vessel had laid a mine field at the mouth of the Haeju Man and then reported to base the location of the sea mines. Two days later on September 12, PC-703 encountered three small transports and sank them. The three supply vessels were most likely unarmed.

See also

List of border incidents involving North Korea

References
Montross, Lynn. The Inchon Landing—Victory over Time and Tide. The Marine Corps Gazette. July 1951.
Rottman, Gordon R. 'Inch'on 1950'; The last great amphibious assault; Osprey Campaign Series #162; Osprey Publishing, 2006. 
 Schnabel, James F. United States Army in the Korean War: Policy and Direction: The First Year  (Washington: United States Army Center of Military History, 1992 reprint of 1972). CMH Pub 20-1-1. Full text online. Chapters 8–9.
  Simmons, Edwin H.  Over the Seawall: US Marines at Incheon. Part 1 Part 2 (Marines in the Korean War Commemorative Series.)  US Marine Corps History Center, 2000. 69 pp.

Battles and operations of the Korean War in 1950  
Battles of the Korean War involving South Korea 
Battles of the Korean War involving North Korea 
Haeju
History of South Hwanghae Province
September 1950 events in Asia